The Church of Christ is a historic church located at 102 Main Street in Perry, Pike County, Illinois. The Carpenter Gothic church was built in 1880 for Perry's Church of Christ congregation, which formed in 1837. The one-story wooden building has a limestone foundation. The front facade features a three-section steeple and chimneys at the two corners; the steeple consists of a tower with arched windows, a lantern with louvered windows, and a spire atop a mansard roof. The Gothic arched front entrance to the church is located at the base of the tower. Arched stained glass windows with floral and geometric patterns are located on either side of the entrance.

The church was added to the National Register of Historic Places on August 8, 2006.

On Wednesday, October 1, 2014, the church was struck by lightning.  Firefighters were unable to save it, and the remnants of the church will be demolished.

Notes

National Register of Historic Places in Pike County, Illinois
Churches on the National Register of Historic Places in Illinois
Carpenter Gothic architecture in Illinois
Churches completed in 1880
Church fires in the United States